Edmund William Crotty (June 28, 1931 – October 10, 1999) was an American diplomat. A non-career appointee, he served concurrent appointments as the U.S. Ambassador Extraordinary and Plenipotentiary to Antigua and Barbuda, Saint Lucia, Saint Vincent and the Grenadines, Saint Kitts and Nevis, Dominica, Grenada, and Barbados (Appointed: October 22, 1998, Presentation of Credentials: August 17, 1999, Termination of Mission: Died at Gainesville, Florida October 10, 1999).  Before serving as ambassador, he was an attorney, chairman of the executive committee of the Democratic National Committee's board of directors and described as “a player in the highest levels of Democratic Party fund raising.”

Life and career
Born on June 28, 1931 in Claremont, New Hampshire, Crotty grew up in nearby Bellows Falls, Vermont. He graduated as salutatorian at Bellows Falls High School and was the first five-sport letterman in Vermont school history.  He attended Dartmouth College on a full academic scholarship and continued his education at the University of Michigan Law School, also on a scholarship. Crotty died from pneumonia in Gainesville, Florida, on October 10, 1999, at the age of 68.

References

1931 births
1999 deaths
20th-century American diplomats
20th-century American lawyers
Ambassadors of the United States to Barbados
Ambassadors of the United States to Saint Kitts and Nevis
Ambassadors of the United States to Antigua and Barbuda
Ambassadors of the United States to Dominica
Ambassadors of the United States to Grenada
Ambassadors of the United States to Saint Lucia
Ambassadors of the United States to Saint Vincent and the Grenadines
Deaths from pneumonia in Florida
People from Bellows Falls, Vermont
Dartmouth College alumni
University of Michigan Law School alumni
Democratic National Committee people